The Final Four of Everything is a 2007 book written by Mark Reiter and Richard Sandomir on the subject of bracketology.  Bracketology is the process of predicting the field of the NCAA basketball tournament, named as such because it is commonly used to fill in tournament brackets for the postseason. The book was featured in one of Bill Geist's segments on CBS News Sunday Morning in March 2008, shortly after the book came out.  In the segment, Geist interviewed Sandomir (CBS also owns the book's publisher Simon & Schuster).

The Brackets

1. Memorable March Madness Moments

Sandomir's Editorials

Best Bald Guy
Sandomir has two "Regional" brackets in this amusing yet interesting category (Fringed and Shaved Regionals).  Some of the "competitors" include Pope John Paul II, Telly Savalas, Andre Agassi, Curly Howard (The Three Stooges), and Yul Brynner.  The finals would pit Homer Simpson against the winner Mahatma Gandhi.  In his interview with Geist, Sandomir jokes, "...It makes up for the fact that he didn't win the Nobel Peace Prize."

Reiter's Editorials

100. Shakespearian Insults

Other "Brackets"
Best Beer/Lager
Memorable Sports Moments
Guilty Pleasures
Gameshow Catchphrases

The Contributors
Richard Sandomir
Mark Reiter

Comedy books
2007 non-fiction books